Henry Richard Harris (February 2, 1828 – October 15, 1909) was a U.S. Representative from Georgia.

Born in Sparta, Georgia, Harris moved to Greenville, Georgia, in 1833.
He attended an academy in Mount Zion, Georgia, and was graduated from Emory College at Oxford, Georgia, in 1847.
He served as a member of the State constitutional convention in 1861.
During the Civil War he served in the Confederate States Army as a colonel.

Harris was elected as a Democrat to the Forty-third, Forty-fourth, and Forty-fifth Congresses (March 4, 1873 – March 3, 1879).
He was an unsuccessful candidate for reelection in 1878 to the Forty-sixth Congress.

Harris was elected to the Forty-ninth Congress (March 4, 1885 – March 3, 1887).
He was not a candidate for renomination in 1886.
He was appointed by President Cleveland as Third Assistant Postmaster General of the United States and served from April 1, 1887, to March 18, 1889.
He engaged in agricultural pursuits.
He died in Odessadale, Georgia, October 15, 1909.
He was interred in Greenville Cemetery, Greenville, Georgia.

References

External links 
 

1828 births
1909 deaths
Confederate States Army officers
People from Greenville, Georgia
Democratic Party members of the United States House of Representatives from Georgia (U.S. state)
American slave owners
19th-century American politicians